Thomas Payne (1718–1799) was a bookseller and publisher in London.

Tom or Thomas Payne may also refer to:
 Thomas Payn, MP for Melcombe Regis (UK Parliament constituency)
 Thomas Payne (MP for Gloucester)
 Tom Payne, a murder victim – lynched in 1927
 Thomas Payne (Australian politician) (1862–1932)
 Tom Payne (baseball), Negro league baseball player
 Tom Payne (director) (1914–1996), Brazilian film director
 Tom Payne (rugby league), footballer on the 1956 Australia national rugby league team
 Tom Payne (newsreader) (born 1943), Australian television newsreader
 Tom Payne (basketball) (born 1950), American basketball player
 Tony Payne (Thomas Anthony Payne born 1955), American darts player
 Tom Payne (theatre maker) (born 1979), British actor, satirist, theatre maker and environmental humanities academic
 Tom Payne (actor) (born 1982), English actor
 Thomas Payne (soldier) (born 1984), Medal of Honor recipient

See also
 Thomas Paine (disambiguation)